Anton Media Group, formerly Anton Community Newspapers, and also known by its legal name Long Island Community Newspapers, Inc. is a print media company based in Mineola, New York, on Long Island in Nassau County and produces 17 weekly newspapers in Nassau County as well as Long Island Weekly and special sections such as Healthy Living, Camps & Schools, and Dining Guides. Anton Community Newspapers is one of the largest privately owned newspaper companies in New York State.

The current Anton Media Group stems from the 1984 purchase by Karl V. Anton, Jr. of Community Newspapers, Inc., a chain of eight community newspapers on the North Shore of Long Island, from Edward Higgins. By fall, Anton had moved the company's headquarters from Glen Cove, New York, to Mineola, changed the corporate name to Long Island Community Newspapers, and started expanding the chain rapidly, both with purchases and creation of new titles, such as Garden City Life in 1985 and the Hicksville Illustrated News in 1986.

Today, Anton Media Group publishes 17 weekly newspapers in Nassau County, New York, in addition to other bimonthly publications. Anton Media Group serves Long Island's famed Gold Coast area.

After Karl Anton's death, his wife, Angela Susan Anton, became the publisher and CEO of Anton Media Group.

Publications
The current publications for Anton Media Group are:

Weekly newspapers 
The Farmingdale Observer (1960-present)
Floral Park Dispatch (1927-2016)
Garden City Life (1985-present)
Glen Cove Record-Pilot (1917-present)
Great Neck Record (1908-present)
Hicksville Illustrated News (1986-present)
The New Hyde Park Illustrated News (1930-present)
Levittown Tribune (1948-present)
Long Island Weekly 
Massapequa Observer (1959-present)
Manhasset Press (1932-present)
Mineola American (1952-present)
Oyster Bay Enterprise-Pilot (1880-present)
Plainview-Old Bethpage Herald (1956-present)
Port Washington News (1903-present)
Syosset-Jericho Tribune (1958-present)
The Roslyn News (1877-present)
The Westbury Times (1907-present)

Magazines 
Boulevard (2006–2011; 2016–2017)
Great Neck Record Magazine
 Gold Coast Magazine (2014-2016)
 Manhasset Press Magazine
 Port Washington News Magazine
Roslyn News Magazine (2016-present)

References

Alternative weekly newspapers published in the United States
Mineola, New York
Newspapers published in New York (state)